Sharjah International Book Fair (SIBF) is an 11-day international book fair held annually in Sharjah, United Arab Emirates. Its debut edition was launched in 1982 under the guidance and patronage of His Highness Dr. Sheikh Sultan bin Muhammad Al-Qasimi, the UAE Supreme Council Member and Ruler of Sharjah. Having built itself a formidable reputation in its past 35 editions, SIBF today is recognized as one of the world’s top publishing events, and is the largest in the Arab world. SIBF 2018 has been one of the fair’s most successful editions to date. It hosted 1,874  publishing houses from 77 countries, with 1.6 million titles on display, including 80,000 new titles. The fair welcomed 2.23 million visitors, who had access to 20 million books, all under one roof.

Translations Grant
 
The fund was launched in 2011, on the occasion of the 30th annual Sharjah International Book Fair. The  fund was launched continuing SIBF’s efforts to build knowledge-based improved networking, cultural understanding and to promote cross-cultural education. The Sharjah International Book Fair's Translations Grant Fund offers a new and rich cultural experience that gains unprecedented interest at both private and official levels, as it provides funding assistance to both Arab and foreign publishers for the translation of literary works and various titles into various languages. SIBF will provide funding assistance to Arab and foreign publishers for the translation of literary works and various titles into major languages Fiction, Memoir, History, Cookery, Children’s Stories, Adult’s Stories, Poetry and Scientific Books. And historic 1000 BC old books.

SIBF Publishers Conference
 
SIBF, since its past four editions, has been taking off with a two-day Publishers Conference designed to encourage the buying and selling of rights. The SIBF Publishers Conference attracts publishers, wholesalers and booksellers. It is designed to be attractive to a global audience and we expect attendance from publishers and a range of professionals from the international rights community, including translation rights specialists. It also attracts some of the best writing talent and translators in the Arab world. Discussion panels shed light on interesting and important topics, with speakers from all around the world, all about publishing, translating, etc.

Gallery

External links
Sharjah International Book Fair, homepage
Book fairs in the United Arab Emirates